Who's Missing may refer to:

Who's missing?, a children's game
Who's Missing (album), a compilation album by The Who